Cầu Kè is a rural district (huyện) of Trà Vinh province in the Mekong Delta region of Vietnam. As of 2003 the district had a population of 128,555. The district covers an area of 234 km². The district capital lies at Cầu Kè.

References

Districts of Trà Vinh province